The Charcot shower or Charcot douche (alternatively spelled Charko, Scharko, Sharko, Skharko or Šarko) is a type of high-pressure shower invented by the French neurologist Jean-Martin Charcot. Initially used as a medical device, it became popular in spas in the late 19th and early 20th centuries.

The device projects water under high pressure from a shower head, enabling an extra-strong massage over the patient's entire body. It is applied from a distance of 3.0–3.5m (8.5–10 feet) using water at a temperature of 15°–20 °C (60°–68 °F) and at a pressure of 1.5–3 atmospheres. The procedure can cause hematoma (bruising).

References

Medical equipment
Massage therapy